Caravan site may refer to:

 Campsite
 Halting site